Archibald Lamont  (21 October 1907 – 16 March 1985) was a Scottish geologist, palaeontologist, Scottish Nationalist writer, poet and politician. He named the trilobite genus Wallacia after William Wallace.

Life
Born on 21 October 1907 at Ardbeg Villa, Ardbeg, Rothesay, Bute, the son of Barbara Mathie and lawyer John McNab Lamont OBE. He was educated at Port Bannatyne School and Rothesay Academy (1918–25). He studied science at the University of Glasgow graduating with an MA in 1928, a BSc in 1932 and, specialising in geology at postgraduate level, gained a doctorate (PhD) in 1935. He was active in the Glasgow University Scottish Nationalist Association and wrote extensively for the University magazine, under various pseudonyms. In the 1950s, he was active in the Scottish National Congress.

He began his academic career as assistant lecturer in 1936 and during the same year married Rose Bannatyne Mackinlay with whom he fathered a son they named Patrick John Coll Lamont. In 1944 he became lecturer in geology at the University of Birmingham and was then appointed Carnegie Research Fellow at the University of Edinburgh (1945–55).

Lamont was elected a Fellow of the Royal Society of Edinburgh on 6 March 1950, upon the proposal of Sir Edward B Bailey, Arthur Holmes, John G C Anderson and Frederick William Anderson.

He was also a Fellow of the Geological Society of London, and a member of the Edinburgh Geological Society and the Geological Society of Glasgow.

Archie retired from teaching at the age of 38  in order to live alone at Jess cottage  in the village of Carlops, situated in the Pentland Hills,  SW of Penicuik, Midlothian. He died on 16 March 1985.

The trilobite Wallacia
Named for the famed Scottish knight, Sir William Wallace, Wallacia Lamont 1978  is a monophyletic group of late Llandovery and, exceptionally, earliest Wenlock encrinurine trilobites from the Baltic area, the British Isles, and Canada. Wallacia is regarded as sister taxon to Encrinurus sensu stricto and includes at least ten named species.

References

 Royal Society of Edinburgh Year Book, 1986, 190 - 1.

1907 births
1985 deaths
People from Rothesay, Bute
Alumni of the University of Glasgow
Academics of the University of Birmingham
Academics of the University of Edinburgh
Academics of the University of Glasgow
Fellows of the Royal Society of Edinburgh
Fellows of the Geological Society of London
Scottish geologists
Scottish journalists
Scottish nationalists
Scottish palaeontologists
Scottish political writers
Scottish Renaissance
20th-century Scottish writers